Santa Maria del Suffragio is a Late-Baroque-style, Roman Catholic church located on Via Serafino Ferruzzi in Ravenna, region of Emilia Romagna, Italy.

The church was designed by Francesco Fontana, son of Carlo Fontana, and erected between 1701 and 1728. The church was commissioned by the Confraternity of Beata Vergine dei Suffragi. The layout of the church is octagonal. Antonio Martinetti sculpted the eight stucco statues of the inside. The main altarpiece is by Andrea Barbiani. The statues and bas-reliefs of the façade are by Celio and Giovanni Toschini.

References 

18th-century Roman Catholic church buildings in Italy
Roman Catholic churches completed in 1728
Roman Catholic churches in Ravenna
Baroque architecture in Ravenna
1728 establishments in Italy